Harpacticoida is an order of copepods, in the subphylum Crustacea. This order comprises 463 genera and about 3,000 species; its members are benthic copepods found throughout the world in the marine environment (most families) and in fresh water (essentially the Ameiridae, Parastenocarididae and the Canthocamptidae). A few of them are planktonic or live in association with other organisms. Harpacticoida represents the second-largest meiofaunal group in marine sediments, after nematodes. In Arctic and Antarctic seas, Harpacticoida are common inhabitants of sea ice. The name Harpacticoida comes from the Greek noun harpacticon (rapacious predator) and the suffix -oid (akin to) and means reminiscent of a predator .

Harpacticoids are distinguished from other copepods by the presence of only a very short pair of first antennae. The second pair of antennae are biramous, and the major joint within the body is located between the fourth and fifth body segments. They typically have a wide abdomen, and often have a somewhat worm-like body.

Families
53 families are currently recognised in the Harpacticoida:

Adenopleurellidae
Aegisthidae
Ameiridae
Ancorabolidae
Arenopontiidae
Argestidae
Balaenophilidae
Canthocamptidae
Chappuisiidae
Cletodidae
Cletopsyllidae
Cristacoxidae
Cylindropsyllidae
Dactylopusiidae
Darcythompsoniidae
Ectinosomatidae
Hamondiidae
Harpacticidae
Idyanthidae
Laophontidae
Laophontopsidae
Latiremidae
Leptastacidae
Leptopontiidae
Louriniidae
Metidae
Miraciidae
Nannopodidae
Neobradyidae
Normanellidae
Novocriniidae
Orthopsyllidae
Parameiropsidae
Paramesochridae
Parastenheliidae
Parastenocarididae
Peltidiidae
Phyllognathopodidae
Pontostratiotidae
Porcellidiidae
Protolatiremidae
Pseudotachidiidae
Rhizothricidae
Rometidae
Rotundiclipeidae
Superornatiremidae
Tachidiidae
Tegastidae
Tetragonicipitidae
Thalestridae
Thompsonulidae
Tisbidae
Zosimeidae

References

External links

 Harpacticoida, Guide to the marine zooplankton of south eastern Australia, Tasmanian Aquaculture and Fisheries Institute

 
Crustacean orders